The Second St. Siloam Missionary Baptist Church is an historic Baptist church located in Brewton, Alabama, United States.

History
On November 5, 1909, a group of worshipers gathered in the Congregational Church at the corner of St. Joseph and Evergreen avenues to organize the Second St. Siloam Missionary Baptist Church. On June 10, 1910, the congregation dedicated the new church, which is located on the corner of East and North streets. The church's first pastor was Rev. Williams Franklin.

The church features a unique design, with the interior core forming a cross with a three sided cathedral balcony, ceiling, and bell tower.

The church building has been named in the Alabama Register of Landmarks and Heritage

References

Baptist churches in Alabama
Buildings and structures in Escambia County, Alabama